Ossein is the organic extracellular matrix of bone, which is made of 95% collagen. It can be isolated by treating bones with hydrochloric acid, which dissolves the inorganic matrix (calcium phosphate and calcium carbonate). This substance is used in industry for the production of gelatin and bone glue.

In the early 20th century, bones were found to consist of three types of proteins: ossein (collagens), osseomucoid (proteoglycans) and osseoalbuminoid (elastin). Advances in molecular biology rendered these terms obsolete.

Applications
When processed industrially, 1,000 kg of bones yield 300 kg of ossein, which can be rapidly degraded and partially denatured by the prolonged action of slightly acidic boiling water, yielding gelatin. The product is specifically known as ossein gelatin in contrast to skin gelatin, which is generated from animal hides. Depending on the method of extraction, there are various types of ossein gelatin (acid ossein gelatin, limed ossein gelatin, etc.).

Another prominent use of ossein is the production of bone glue, whose yield is 16-20% of the mass of dry bone.

The deproteinized bone residue left after the removal of ossein can be used to produce bone ash for the manufacture of bone china. Bones that are unsuitable for ossein production are carbonized to generate bone char.

See also
Bone mineral

References

Bone products
Extracellular matrix